Salman Aljumaili (born 10 January 1963) is an Iraqi politician, and Iraq's Planning Minister from 2014 to 2018. He was born 10 January 1963 in Fallujah, Iraq.

Bio
He was the Minister of Planning in the government of Haider Abadi in 2014, and was a former member of the Iraqi Council of Representatives and Chairman of the "Iraqi List" and Vice-Chairman of the Committee on Foreign Relations in the House of Representatives. He was born in Fallujah in 1963 and graduated from the Faculty of Law and Politics, University of Baghdad in 1986–87 and then received his doctorate in political science from the Nahrain University.

References

External links
Official website(Iraqi Minister of Planning )
 Official website(Ministry of Planning)

1963 births
Living people
Iraqi Sunni Muslims
Members of the Council of Representatives of Iraq
People from Fallujah
University of Baghdad alumni